The name Trollope is  derived from the place-name Troughburn, in Northumberland, England,  originally Trolhop, Norse for "troll valley". The earliest recorded use of the surname is John Andrew Trolope (1427–1461) who lived in Thornlaw, Co. Durham and Sir Andrew Trollope (died 1461) who was an English soldier during the later stages of the Hundred Years' War and at the time of the Wars of the Roses.

Spelling variations of this family name include Trollop, Trollope, Trolloop, Trollup, Trollupe, and others.

Notable Trollopes include:

 Andrew Trollope (died 1461), English professional soldier
 Anthony Trollope (1815–1882), English novelist and civil servant
 Arthur William Trollope (1768–1827), English cleric, headmaster of Christ's Hospital
 Edward Trollope (1817–1893), English antiquary and Anglican Bishop of Nottingham
 Frances Eleanor Trollope (1835–1913), English novelist, second wife of Thomas Adolphus Trollope
 Frances Milton Trollope (1780–1863), English novelist, mother of Thomas Adolphus Trollope and Anthony Trollope
 Henry Trollope (1756–1839), Royal Navy admiral
 Joanna Trollope (born 1943), English novelist
 John Lightfoot Trollope (1897–1958), British First World War flying ace
 John Trollope, 1st Baron Kesteven (1800–1874), President of the English Poor Law Board
 John Trollope (footballer) (born 1944), English association football player
 Mark Trollope (1862–1930), Anglican Bishop in Korea
 Paul Trollope (born 1972), English football coach and former professional footballer
 Robert Trollope, 17th-century English architect
 Rowan Trollope (born 1972), Canadian business administrator, former Group President, Symantec Corporation
 Theodosia Trollope (1816–1865), English poet, translator and writer, first wife of Thomas Adolphus Trollope
 Thomas Adolphus Trollope (1810–1892), English writer

Notes

References
 D Hey Family Names and Family History (2000) . 
 P H Reaney Dictionary of British Surnames ( 1958).

External links 
Vanity Fair - Mrs. Trollope's America
 The Trollope Society
 Novelist, Joanna Trollope
 The USA Trollope Society
  Notts History Society
 Oxford Biography

English-language surnames